Bacillus nealsonii is a species of bacteria first isolated from a spacecraft-assembly facility. Its spores are γ-radiation resistant. It is Gram-positive, facultatively anaerobic, rod-shaped and produces endospores. Its type strain is FO-92T (=ATCC BAA-519T =DSM 15077T).

This species has been recently transferred into the genus Niallia. The correct nomenclature is Niallia nealsonii.

References

Further reading

External links

LPSN
Type strain of Bacillus nealsonii at BacDive -  the Bacterial Diversity Metadatabase

nealsonii
Bacteria described in 2003